Robert A. Millikan Senior High School is a high school in Long Beach, California, United States, administered by the Long Beach Unified School District. It is located near the intersection of Spring Street and Palo Verde Avenue in the Los Altos neighborhood of East Long Beach on a 36-acre campus. As of the 20072008 school year, Millikan High School had 4,500 students. Millikan is an AP school and does not offer IB courses.

Eponym
Millikan High School is named after the Nobel Prize winner Robert Andrews Millikan.

Academies
Millikan is separated into five small learning communities (SLC's) each specializing in different fields. They all have different paths for success and different requirements to enter.

COMPASS
The COMPASS (Community of Musicians, Performers, Artists, and Social Scientists) Academy is a smaller learning community designed to prepare students for college by engaging them in a program that integrates core curriculum with the social sciences and the arts. This program places emphasis on standards-based instruction while helping students to connect learning with real-world situations. COMPASS is also in charge of the school's literary arts magazine, Visions.

MBA
(Millikan Business Academy) promotes life skills and college-preparedness with an emphasis on entrepreneurship, marketing, enterprise, and financial independence.

PEACE
(Personal success through Empowerment, Academic achievement, Character education, and Ethics in action) is an academy that engages such programs as stimulations (Contemporary World Project, International Negotiations and Panopticon Role Playing), hands-on learning, community service, and field experience.

QUEST
(Questioning, Understanding, Engaging, - Success through Technology), is a GATE magnet for gifted honors students. QUEST students commit to a four-year, college preparatory program that encourages diversity of thought and scholarly endeavor. The academic independence of QUEST Scholars culminates in a self-directed Senior Project. The curriculum includes accelerated, honors, and a minimum of five Advanced Placement (AP) classes and exams. QUEST students are supported in post-secondary planning through counseling and an academic portfolio. In addition to academic studies, QUEST students are participants in campus extra- and co-curricular activities.

SEGA 
Millikan's newly designed Software Engineering and Gaming Academy is a four-year college preparatory program emphasizing computer applications, programming and game design. The academy offers a college preparatory education, including AP Computer Science Principles and AP Computer Science A, which provides the foundation for students to enter college and/or become certified to be competitive in the world of work.  Formerly known as MIT (Millikan Integrated Technology), and previous to that, Global Technology.

AVID
The school uses the program AVID (Advancement Via Individual Determination) to prepare students for attendance at a college or university.

Choral music
The choral program consists of six courses: Choraleers Singers 1–2 which is a freshman girls class; Varsity Chorale 1–8, a freshman boys class; Cecillian Singers 3–8, an intermediate girls class; Concert Choir 1–8, a large, advanced, Co-Ed group of vocalists consisting of 100 singers; Vocal Point, a jazz and a cappella female group, sung on microphone; and Vocal Ensemble, the Co-Ed equivalent of Vocal Point.

Instrumental Music
The instrumental music program consists of Gold Jazz Band, Blue Jazz Band, Symphonic Winds, Concert Band, Marching Band, Orchestra, Chamber Orchestra, and Symphonic Orchestra.

Each year the music ensembles compete in festivals throughout the United States. In recent years Millikan musicians have traveled to compete in festivals in San Francisco, San Diego, Las Vegas and Reno. In the spring of 2006, the Symphonic Orchestra performed in a national festival at the Historic Boston Symphony Hall in Boston, Massachusetts.

Athletics
Millikan teams include Cross Country, Tennis, Badminton, Water Polo, Dance, Football, Colorguard, Golf, Surf, Marching Band, Basketball, Volleyball, Soccer, Wrestling, Baseball, Gymnastics, Swim, Softball, Track, Water polo, Lacrosse, and Cheer  Some sports are co-ed while others are not. 2018 marked the first year for a female to score a point for the Millikan Rams varsity football.

Newspaper
Millikan's newspaper is the Corydon. It has been running since 1957.

Notable alumni

 Susie Atwood, double Olympic medalist, 1972 Olympics, backstroke
 Ryan Bailey, Olympic water polo player
 Jason Bell, NFL player
 Jennifer Bermingham, professional golfer
 Nick Bierbrodt, baseball player
 Alden Darby, NFL player
 Marcus Dove, basketball player
 Dave Frost, professional baseball player
 Mike Gallo, professional baseball player 
 Gary Garrison, professional football player with San Diego Chargers
 Jack Grisham, TSOL vocalist, author An American Demon: A Memoir 
 Gene Hoglan, metal musician
 Soben Huon, Miss Utah USA 2006
 Wendi McLendon-Covey, actress on ABC's The Goldbergs, actress on Comedy Central's Reno 911!, and the film Bridesmaids
 Charles McShane, NFL player
 Mike Montgomery, Golden State Warriors and University of California basketball coach
 Tino Nuñez, professional soccer player
 Syd O'Brien, professional baseball player 
 Greg Sampson, football player, sixth pick of 1972 NFL draft
 Chris Saunders, UFC, The Ultimate Fighter: Live - Season 15
 Jonathan Singleton, professional baseball player 
 Craig Swan, professional baseball player
 Mike Tully, pole vaulter, 1984 Summer Olympics silver medalist

References

High schools in Long Beach, California
Long Beach Unified School District
 
Public high schools in California
1956 establishments in California